Bruce Lazarus (born in New York City) is an entertainment attorney and theatrical producer notable for his work on Broadway and off-Broadway.

Samuel French Inc.
Bruce was appointed Executive Director of Samuel French Inc. in October 2012 and served in that capacity until 2019. As Executive Director, Lazarus oversees company strategy, acquisitions, marketing, licensing and business affairs in New York, Los Angeles, and London.  "Samuel French matters - we matter to those who create, study and love theatre and to the future generations who will create, study and love theatre," Lazarus said in a statement. "I am honored to be working side by side with the dedicated and passionate staff at Samuel French. We make theatre happen, worldwide, everyday!" Samuel French is the oldest and largest publisher and licensor of plays and musicals in the world, and has been active since 1830.

Theatre
Bruce Lazarus received a 2003 Tony Award for Best Play nomination for the Broadway production of Say Goodnight Gracie by Rupert Holmes which starred Frank Gorshin and won the 2004 National Broadway Theatre Award for the national tour.
His other Broadway producing credits include The Gathering by Arje Shaw which starred Hal Linden.

Bruce Lazarus also produced several notable off-Broadway productions including Shakespeare's Romeo and Juliet adapted by Joe Calarco for which he won the 1998 Lucile Lortel Award for Outstanding Production; Only Kidding by Jim Geoghan for which he won the 1989 Drama Desk Award Outstanding New Play nomination and for which two of its stars Paul Provenza and Howard Speigel won the 1989 Theatre World Awards.

His producing partners include Frederic B. Vogel, Roger Gindi, Dana Matthow, Allan Sandler, Steve Leber, David Krebs, Patrick Hogan, William Franzblau, Martha R. Gasparian, Lawrence S. Toppall, Martin Markinson, and Elsa Daspin Haft.

Bruce Lazarus has produced original productions of plays by Rupert Holmes, Arje Shaw, William Shakespeare, Jim Geoghan, JJ Barry, Peppy Castro, John Gay, and Diane Frolov.

Directors he has collaborated with include: Larry Arrick, John Tillinger, Jeremy Dobrish, Genarro Montanino, Rebecca Taylor, and Joe Calarco.

As a theatrical attorney Bruce Lazarus has represented over 20 Broadway and off-Broadway shows including: Blueman Group:Tubes, The Lion King, Aida and Beauty and the Beast in his capacity as Director of Business and Legal Affairs for Walt Disney Theatrical Productions.

He has taught the legal aspects of producing commercial theatre at the Commercial Theatre Institute in New York, at Carnegie Mellon University in Pittsburgh, Pennsylvania and at the UCLA School of Continuing Education.

Bruce Lazarus is a member of the New York State Bar (Appellate Division First Department), Advisory Board Member at Southwestern University School of Law Donald E. Biederman Entertainment and Media Law Institute, and a member of the League of American Theatres and Producers.

Talent Manager and Coach

Bruce Lazarus began his entertainment business career as a talent agent. He later became the personal manager for Ray Liotta, David Caruso, Troy Beyer, Philip Baker Hall and Marian Mercer.

Education
Bruce Lazarus attended Southwestern University School of Law, in Los Angeles, California where he received his Juris Doctor degree in 1986.
He received his bachelor's degree from the University of Miami, in Coral Gables, Florida where he majored in Theatre Arts.

References

External links

Bruce Lazarus at the Internet Off-Broadway Database

Samuel French Inc.

American theatre managers and producers
Living people
Year of birth missing (living people)